Vallisneria spiralis, also known as straight vallisneria, tape grass, or eel grass is a common aquarium plant that prefers good light and a nutrient rich substrate. In the wild, it can be found in tropical and sub-tropical regions worldwide.

Overview
It has narrow, linear leaves that range in colour from a pale-green to reddish up to 3 feet (1 m) long and up to 0.75 inches broad. V. spiralis is monoecious with male flowers carried on long spiral stalks that break away from the plant and float on the water's surface. In the variety V.s, gigantea the female flowers are on stalks (pedicels) up to six feet (1.85 meters) in length. After the female flowers have been pollinated, the pedicel curls up like a tendril, drawing the young fruit closer to the bed of the stream or pond; thus the name "spiralis". Seeds have not been observed germinating in aquaria. Instead, it most often propagates by runners which can lead to dense stands.

One form of this plant has been described: V. spiralis f. tortifolia, which has also been elevated to the species level by some taxonomists under the name V. tortissima. The form has tightly twisted leaves. Along with this form, many other trade names have been developed for small variations on the species. Their taxonomic status is uncertain.

Invasive species
The species is an effective invader due to its efficient dispersal, vegetative reproduction, high biomass production, and popularity in the aquarium trade. V. spiralis is an "unwanted organism" in New Zealand. It is listed on the National Pest Plant Accord prohibiting it from sale and commercial propagation and distribution. Since 2013 V.spiralis has been listed as a naturalized alien in Iceland, where it was recorded in geothermal ponds.

References

External links
 AquaHobby
 AquaHobby var. tortissima
 Wet Web Media
 Tropica spiralis 'Tiger'
 Plants for a Future

Hydrocharitaceae
Freshwater plants
Plants described in 1753
Taxa named by Carl Linnaeus